The Israeli National Badminton Championships is a tournament organized to crown the best badminton players in Israel. They are held since 1977.

Past winners

References

External links 
  Israel Badminton Association

Badminton tournaments in Israel
National badminton championships
Sports competitions in Israel
1977 establishments in Israel
Recurring sporting events established in 1977